

Events
February 26 - Nabonassar becomes king of Assyria
Meles becomes king of Lydia
 The Lusatian culture city at Biskupin is founded.

Births

Deaths

References

740s BC